Gal Nir (born March 30, 1983) is an Israeli football (soccer) goalkeeper.

Nir began his career in the youth club of Hapoel Tel Aviv and moved later on to the youth club of Hapoel Ironi Rison LeZion, where he also played in the seniors team.

In 2002 Nir moved to Hapoel Kfar Saba but left after one season to Maccabi Tel Aviv, where he was for two seasons the second goalkeeper after Liran Strauber. He then moved to Maccabi Netanya, where he was the second goalkeeper after Avi Peretz.

Nir played for Maccabi Netanya, where he was the second goalkeeper after Liran Strauber.  The interesting thing about it is, that also in Maccabi Tel Aviv he was the second goalkeeper after the same Strauber.

In June 2009 Nir signed with Ironi Nir Ramat HaSharon in the Liga Leumit where he will be the first choice in his position.

Honours
Israel State Cup:
2005
Toto Cup (Leumit):
2010
Liga Leumit:
2010-11

References

1983 births
Living people
Israeli Jews
Israeli footballers
Liga Leumit players
Israeli Premier League players
Association football goalkeepers
Hapoel Kfar Saba F.C. players
Hapoel Rishon LeZion F.C. players
Maccabi Tel Aviv F.C. players
Maccabi Netanya F.C. players
Hapoel Nir Ramat HaSharon F.C. players
Hapoel Ra'anana A.F.C. players
Maccabi Ahi Nazareth F.C. players
Footballers from Rishon LeZion